Swaroop Mahavir Unhalkar (born 1987) is an Indian Para Pistol shooter. He is currently World No 13 in Men's 10m Air Rifle standing SH1  (World Shooting Para Sport Rankings).

2020 Summer Paralympics 
He Qualified For Paralympics Games at Tokyo, Japan and represented India Team in Shooting at 2020 Summer Paralympics in Tokyo, Japan. He qualified for finals of Men's 10m AR Standing SH1 shooting and stood 4th with a score of 203.9.

See also
Paralympic Committee of India
 India at the Paralympics

References

1987 births
Living people
Indian male sport shooters
Paralympic shooters of India
Indian sportsmen
People from Maharashtra
Shooters at the 2020 Summer Paralympics
21st-century Indian people